Nawat Itsaragrisil is a Thai media personality and businessperson, best known as the president of Miss Grand International organization.

Nawat first became known for travel TV shows, first hosting Exhibition Show and then Kon Thueng Chan for ITV. He then joined Channel 3, hosting the travel segment variety talk show Today Show and becoming the director and executive producer of the Miss Thailand World beauty pageant from 2007 to 2012. He started his own beauty pageant franchise, Miss Grand International in 2013.

Appearances 
 Television 
 2008 : โวยาเจอร์ เกมการเดินทางในต่างแดน On Air Channel 9 (2008-2009)
 2004 : ทไวไลท์โชว์ On Air Channel 3 (2004-2007)
 2009 : ทูไนท์โชว์ On Air Channel 3 (2009-2015)
 2012 : เพชรรามา On Air Channel 3 (2012-2021)
 2013 : ครัวคุณต๋อย On Air Channel 3 (2013-2021)
 2009 : ทูเดย์โชว์ On Air Channel 3 (2009-2021)

Controversies 
In 2016, Nawat was reported by Miss Iceland 2015, Arna Ýr Jónsdóttir  to have said that "she's too fat and needed to lose weight" prior to the finals of Miss Grand International 2016 held in Las Vegas on October 25, 2016, eventually dropping out of the pageant before the coronation due to the controversy. In a statement, Nawat said that they give similar advice to other contestants who asked what should they do to improve in order to win. Nawat eventually said that he had spoken with Jónsdóttir along with the company's vice president and clarified matters. In 2022, Nawat has also publicly stated in a live stream that "Miss Vietnam had too long a torso and too short legs" as to the reason why Miss Vietnam failed to make top 10 in Miss Grand International 2022, enraging Vietnamese beauty fans.

Nawat has also expressed displeasure about the behavior of Filipino pageant fans online. This is after several incidents of Filipino pageant fans attacking him on social media. These incidents include accusations of Nawat rigging the results of Miss Grand International, of him having a bias against Filipina contestants, an Instagram post where Nawat insinuated that the coronation of Catriona Gray as Miss Universe 2018 was a rigged affair and saying that Miss Philippines 2018 didn't make it due to the rest of the contestants being better than her.

Nawat has also gotten into a verbal row with the Miss Supranational organization after the then reigning Miss Supranational Chanique Rabe did not include Miss Grand into what she considers the "Big Five" of pageants, saying that those pageants were "minor crowns".

References

Miss Grand International
Nawat Itsaragrisil
Nawat Itsaragrisil
Nawat Itsaragrisil
Nawat Itsaragrisil
Nawat Itsaragrisil
Nawat Itsaragrisil
Dominica businesspeople
Living people
1973 births